Balachaur is a town in Balachaur Tehsil in the Shaheed Bhagat Singh Nagar District of Punjab, India.

History

Raja Raj Dev, a Rajput, came to Balachaur along with his family to meditate. He was related to the family of the King of Jaipur. He soon named the tehsil after his son, Balraj as "Balachaur". In 1539, Sher-Shah-Suri took the blessing of Raj Dev before attacking Humayun. Raj Dev died in 1596, and people built his tomb in the tehsil to worship him as Baba Balraj. A committee named as "Balraj Mandir Committee" was created in 1949, and its president was Zaildar Balwant Singh. The current president is Rana Purshotam Singh.

Demographics
Balachaur is a Municipal Council city in the district of Shahid Bhagat Singh Nagar, Punjab. Balachaur city is divided into 13 wards for which elections are held every 5 years. The Balachaur Municipal Council has a population of 21,631 of which 11,180 are males while 10,451 are females as per a report released by Census India 2011.

Balachaur is an important place for nearby villages because it is a tehsil. It has Punjab government offices which serve the local villagers. Earlier there had been no higher education in Balacahur. Currently, there is a college called Baba Balraj Government College on Bhaddi Road.

Commerce
The main source of income in Balachaur is agriculture, with wheat and maize being the two main crops. Many people work in the government or private sectors in neighboring towns and cities, primarily Nawanshahr, Ropar, Ludhiana, and Chandigarh. There is a big market that serves the people of Balachaur and nearby villages. Balachaur also has a big grain market (Anaaj Mandi) where the field produce is sold to wholesalers. The S.V. Cold Drink factory, which was set up in 2003, manufactures Lava Cold Drinks in Sudha Mazra (Balachaur).

Transport
Balachaur is well connected by roads to all major cities in Punjab. Balachaur is on the main highway to Jallandhar, located off a highway that goes to Pathankot/Jammu. The nearest railway station is Garhshankar and the nearest airport is Chandigarh. From Balachaur there are buses (both private and public) available for passengers to go to major cities of Punjab as well as Himachal, Haryana, and Delhi. Various other modes of transportation are also available for local travel. Balachaur is a Tehsil, situated almost equidistant from Nawanshahr, Roopnagar (25 km), Garshankar (25 km), and Nurpur Bedi (24 km). Other big cities near Balachaur are Ludhiana, Chandigarh (68 km), Hoshiarpur (70 km), Anandpur Sahib (68 km), and Jalandhar (75 km).

Villages
Balachaur Tehsil has a total 185 Village in its jurisdiction.
Sahdra is a village that belongs to Balachaur Tehsil located near Majari.  It has two Gurudwaras and  a secondary school.
Sudha Majra Alais Fatehgarh is situated on the Chandigarh Jalandhar highways. There is a historical Gurudwara Tahli Shaib built in the memory of Guru Hargobind Singh Ji. It had a population of 1200.

Gahoon (Punjabi-ਗਹੁੰਣ) is named for the people who lived on the bank of the sea called ("ਗਾਹਣਿਅੇ"). According to the 2001 India census, Gahoon had a population of 1100: 53% male and 47% female. Gahoon has an average literacy rate of 72.6% with 56% males and 44% females. Fifteen percent (15%) of the population is under 6 years of age.

Garhi Kanugoan (ਗੜੀ ਕਾਨੂੰਗੋਅਾਂ) is located on Nawanshahr road. There is a historical and oldest Shiv Mandir, Gurdwara of Baba Jawahar Singh Ji (Falahi Sahib) Main Gurdwara Sahib, Gurdwara Sahidan Sahib, Patka Sahib, Majar Baba Roshan Shah Wali, and this village is located nearly midway between 4 main cities:  from Chandigarh, 73 km from Jalandhar,  from Hoshiarpur and 65 km from Ludhiana, village Thopia 4 km.

Taunsa is located on mohali phagwara highway and is surrounded by plethora of pharmaceutical companies, namely Sun Pharma, Centrient, Health Caps and many more. This village provides residence to many employees working in these firms; most of the labor comes from the states of Uttar Pradesh and Bihar. The market of Taunsa is well known by the neighbouring villages such as Rel majra, Banah, Tajowal, Majran Jattan.

References

External links
 District Shahid Bhagat Singh Nagar: Cities and Towns
 Nawanshahr district population statistics
 Balachaur
 Schools in Balachaur 

Cities and towns in Shaheed Bhagat Singh Nagar district